Peters Glacier is a glacier flowing southward into the west side of Cheapman Bay, South Georgia. Named by United Kingdom Antarctic Place-Names Committee (UK-APC) for Nikolaus Peters, a leading German authority on whales and whaling and Director of Reichstelle fur Walforschung, Hamburg, 1937–1940.

See also
 List of glaciers in the Antarctic
 Glaciology

Glaciers of South Georgia